This is a list of members of the Victorian Legislative Assembly from the elections of 23 September – 24 October 1856 to those of 26 August – 26 September 1859. The Assembly was created in 1856.

Note the "Term in Office" refers to that members term(s) in the Assembly, not necessarily for that electorate.

Notes
 O'Shanassy won both Melbourne and Kilmore districts, deciding to represent the latter he resigned from Melbourne. The by-election for Melbourne in January 1857 was won by Henry Langlands.
 Baragwanath resigned in December 1857, replaced by John Everard in an January 1858 by-election.
 Cameron resigned in March 1857, replaced by John Wood in an April 1857 by-election.
 Childers resigned in February 1857, replaced by John Findlay in a July 1857 by-election.
 Clarke resigned in August 1858, replaced by Robert Anderson in an October 1858 by-election.
 Fellows resigned in May 1858, replaced by John Crews in a May 1858 by-election.
 Fyfe resigned in November 1857, replaced by George Board in a February 1858 by-election
 Goodman resigned in January 1858, replaced by William Forlonge in a January 1858 by-election. Forlonge resigned in January 1859, replaced in turn by William Nicholson in a January 1859 by-election
 Greeves resigned in March 1857, replaced by Richard Heales in a March 1857 by-election
 Griffith resigned in February 1858, replaced by William Mollison in an April 1858 by-election
 Haines left Parliament around November 1858, replaced by John Bell in a January 1859 by-election.
 King resigned in September 1857, replaced by John Johnson in a November 1857 by-election
 McDougall resigned in August 1857, replaced by Joseph Wilkie in an August 1857 by-election
 Palmer resigned in July 1857, replaced by Richard Davies Ireland in an August 1857 by-election
 Pasley resigned in July 1857, replaced by Sidney Ricardo in a July 1857 by-election.
 Pyke resigned in February 1857, replaced by Robert Sitwell in a March 1857 by-election
 Read resigned in February 1858, replaced by James Harrison in an April 1858 by-election
 Rutherford resigned in July 1857, replaced by Theodore Hancock in a July 1857 by-election
 Sargood resigned in December 1857, replaced by Henry Chapman in a January 1858 by-election.
 Sladen resigned in March 1857, replaced by Alexander Thomson in December 1857
 Stawell resigned in February 1857, replaced by James Service in March 1857
 Were resigned in February 1857, replaced by Charles Ebden in a March 1857 by-election

References

Members of the Parliament of Victoria by term
19th-century Australian politicians